The White House Medical Unit (WHMU) is a unit of the White House Military Office and is responsible for the medical needs of White House staff and visitors. The unit also provides medical care to the president, the vice president, their families, and international dignitaries visiting the White House.

Role
The WHMU is led by a director, who may also serve as the physician to the president, although in recent years, the roles have frequently been separated. The physician to the president is chosen personally by the president and is primarily responsible for the health of the president as a person, while the director is formally chosen by the director of the White House Military Office and is responsible for ensuring the optimal programs are in place to provide health and medical support to the continuity of the presidency to include care for those who support the duties of the president. 

The medical unit includes active-duty military physicians as well as several physician assistants, registered nurses, and medics, and support staff including an administrator and a medical information technology manager. Under implementing guidelines for the Twenty-fifth Amendment to the United States Constitution, the WHMU director is the primary official responsible for advising the president's Cabinet on the ability of the president of the United States to discharge the powers and duties of the office. The final decision, however, rests with the Cabinet as a political, not a medical, decision. The WHMU provides free healthcare to the president, vice president, and their immediate families, who are eligible for medical care at American military hospitals anywhere in the world. Just as with any other military beneficiary, if any of these officials or family members have health insurance, which they generally do as government employees, inpatient medical care at American military hospitals is billed to this health insurance.

In addition to direct care duties as outlined above, the WHMU is responsible for all medical contingency planning for the White House and its key personnel under its mission of supporting the continuity of the presidency.  This includes preparing for every presidential or vice presidential trip by developing medical contingency plans, including the identification of hospitals and other facilities at which medical care could be provided. The goal is to ensure that the president is never more than 20 ground minutes away from a hospital with high level (general Level 1 Trauma Center). If this is not possible, the WHMU working with the White House Military Office and the United States Secret Service, ensures that a military helicopter is nearby, kept in instant readiness to evacuate the president to an appropriate hospital.

Staff
The total number of staff on duty at the White House Medical Unit varies over time. In 2001, there were 22 total staff, although by 2010 this had risen to 24 total staff. Although the number of physician assistants is not clear, as of 2012 there were five physicians and three medics assigned to the unit. As of 2001, there were six registered nurses assigned to the WHMU, each of whom served a two-year term and was trained and certified in providing emergency care, resuscitation, and trauma care.

 WHMU staff are board-certified in the fields of emergency medicine, family medicine, or internal medicine.  All staff also have certification in trauma care and the provision of cardiac life support.  According to a 2009 news report, doctors accepted for assignment to the WHMU undergo a full year of trauma care training before joining the staff.

At least one physician is on duty in the Executive Residence at all times.

Staff almost always wear civilian street and medical clothing, since military uniforms would draw sniper fire and prevent the WHMU staff from performing their jobs in an emergency.

Facilities
The White House Medical Unit includes emergency medical and trauma capability at both the White House and the residence of the vice president of the United States at the United States Naval Observatory. One former physician to the president described the White House unit as an urgent care center with a crash cart. A medical examination room is also maintained at the Eisenhower Executive Office Building.

Between 1993 and 2001, Rear Admiral Eleanor Mariano reoriented the WHMU more toward the provision of emergency medical services. The unit also began to provide 24-hour care at the White House, and added a medical suite to the vice presidential residence to provide the vice president with the same level of care provided to the president. A physician now staffs the vice presidential medical suite at all times. Because jet lag and extremely long hours are common among WHMU staff, a rule limiting staff to 24-hour duty periods was also implemented, and shift rotations created to allow advance medical team staff to take over from traveling staff to limit fatigue.

Between 2002 and 2009, the WHMU implemented a program to provide medical training specific to the international locales which the president or vice president might travel. This training helps prepare the medical staff for specific or unusual medical situations needed in each place the President or Vice President visits.

The WHMU also oversees the mobile medical suite aboard Air Force One and Air Force Two. Air Force One contains a full surgical suite with operating table, two beds, resuscitation equipment, various medical monitors, and a full pharmacy. Air Force Two contains a first aid unit as well as an automated external defibrillator, oxygen tanks, and limited pharmaceuticals.  The WHMU also establishes temporary emergency medical facilities as needed to support presidential or vice presidential trips.  These usually consist of an eight-member intensive care and surgical team, and a temporary operating room at each stop.  WHMU staff may also carry operating room equipment in backpacks to provide emergency medical care as needed on-site when the temporary operating room is too distant. When the president travels overseas, an advance medical team travel ahead of Air Force One to set up its medical facilities days in advance. This way, a fully rested medical team is available to assist the president upon arrival and take over from the team which traveled aboard the presidential aircraft.

A physician and nurse also travel with presidential motorcades. They are strategically positioned so as to be close enough to respond to an emergency but far enough away to minimize the likelihood of being caught in the event.

A WHMU physician and nurse also usually accompany the first lady of the United States when she travels, but a full medical staff and mobile operating suite are not assigned to her.

Coronavirus participation
The White House Medical Unit handled temperature checks for journalists and others as White House moved limited seating to all briefings.

Footnotes
Notes

Citations

External links

White House Military Office
Med
Medical units and formations of the United States
Military medical organizations of the United States
Medical and health organizations based in Washington, D.C.